Cinelerra is a video editing and composition program (an NLE, Non-Linear Editor) designed for Linux. It is free software distributed under the open source GNU General Public License. In addition to editing, it supports advanced composition operations such as keying and mattes, including a title generator, many effects to edit video and audio, keyframe automation, and many other professional functions depending on the variant. It processes audio in 64 floating-point form. Video is processed in RGBA or YUVA color spaces, in 16-bit integer or floating-point form. It is resolution and image refresh rate independent. The GG variant supports up to 8K video, and can also create DVDs and Blu-rays.

History
In 1996 Adam Williams of Heroine Virtual, lead developer of Cinelerra, released a Unix audio editor called Broadcast 1.0 which could handle 2G audio files. In 1997 Broadcast 2.0 was released, still audio only but unlimited tracks. 1999 saw Broadcast2000, which included video.

Because of UI limitations, Williams rewrote significant parts and released that as Cinelerra on August 12, 2002, while Broadcast2000 was withdrawn by Heroine Virtual in September 2001. Cinelerra became the first 64-bit media production application when it was rewritten to work with the AMD Opteron processor in June 2003 and was presented at SIGGRAPH 2004 in San Diego. Since then, many versions have been released.

The original version is still being produced by Adam Williams. There have been several spin-offs made by the open source community, Cinelerra-GG and Cinelerra-CVE (a fork of Cinelerra-CV) are presently under active development. For a complete overview of versions, see the Variants section below. Even though the different variants look the same, there are considerable functional differences between them. 

An overview of the different variants that released more than one version:

Interface
Cinelerra's interface is similar to that of other Non-linear editing systems, such as Adobe Premiere Pro, Final Cut Pro, and Avid Media Composer. However, because it includes a compositing engine, it may also be likened to compositing software such as Adobe After Effects, Smoke on Linux or Shake. The user is by default presented with four windows (clockwise from lower left in picture at top right):
 The timeline, which gives the user a time-based view of all video and audio tracks in the project, as well as keyframe data for e.g. camera movement, effects, or opacity.
 The viewer, which gives the user a method of "scrubbing" (manually moving the playhead forwards or backwards to locate a specific cue or word) through footage.
 The compositor, which presents the user with a view of the final project as it would look when rendered. The compositor is interactive in that it allows the user to adjust the positions of video objects; it also updates in response to user input.
 The resource window, which presents the user with a view of all audio and video resources in the project, as well as available audio and video effects and transitions.

Cinelerra uses its own widget toolkit Guicast (the Cinelerra GUI library), not conforming to the human interface guidelines of major Linux desktops such as GNOME and KDE. This has the advantage that it looks and works the same no matter which distribution or desktop is used, and removes being dependent on a changing version of the desktop (for instance GNOME 2 / GNOME 3).

Usage and awards
Cinelerra has gained ground among some Linux enthusiasts looking for a native video editing system. Professional use was mostly promoted by Linux Media Arts, which sold an integrated hardware and software package for video production that includes Cinelerra. However, the company does not seem to be active in the Cinelerra field anymore.

At the National Association of Broadcasters' 2004 Electronic Media Show, Cinelerra received Bob Turner's "Making the Cut" award, given to "the best and most exciting post-production products seen at the convention".

In December 2018 Libre Graphics World included Cinelerra in its comparison of the sustainability of video editors for Linux.

Cinelerra.org
The cinelerra.org website was originally registered by a member of Cinelerra-CV Community Richard Baverstock on Jan 10 2004. Around January 2014 the Cinelerra-CV Community overlooked the renewal of cinelerra.org. The domain was then taken over by a different project managed by Michael Collins, one of the founders of Cinelerra. The project was following commercial interests, aiming at offering professional support to its users. It was organized to merge all existing Cinelerra projects while also providing additional fixes and enhancements.

Since early 2015, Cinelerra.org has an open Git repository on Google Code for analysis and for input; however, that platform is read-only since 2015-08-24. At the present time, this repository does not contain source code. The project released a studio centric version 5.0 of Cinelerra. The goal of Cinelerra.org was to develop a more professional value to the product as of 2016.

In January 2016, the main developer of the project William Morrow working behind cinelerra.org ("Good Guy") left cinelerra.org, continuing to work on Cinelerra 5.0, then on Cinelerra-GG 5.1 with help from the Cinelerra-CV Community.

At the present time, Cinelerra.org supports Cinelerra-HV work. Its website links in the download section to both the HV and GG versions.

Variants

Cinelerra-HV

Heroine Virtual (HV), the producer of the original Cinelerra, generates a new release of Cinelerra annually, available as source code and a binary for Ubuntu. Although it is open source, the source is only made available as complete download for each release. Intermediate access to source files is not possible. HV has used SourceForge since the beginning (first source 2001-09-09), but does not react to bugs, patches and feature requests on that platform. Any bugs and usability issues found and resolved by the community that are submitted to Heroine Virtual often result in no immediate response, and it is not until a new release that there is any indication that Heroine Virtual has incorporated these changes.

To distinguish between the different variants of the software, the releases made by Heroine Virtual are also called Cinelerra-HV.

Cinelerra-CV / Cinelerra-CVE

Because of both the latency in development and the distribution-specific nature of the original Cinelerra from Heroine Virtual, a group of software developers created their own version of Cinelerra referred to as Cinelerra-CV (where CV stands for community version).

Cinelerra-CV allows the community to contribute to an open repository where changes to the code are accessible to everyone. Mailing list exist where more experienced users and developers can provide support to less experienced users, and developers can hold technical discussions. Cinelerra-CV is also packaged for a wider range of distributions. It also has a different compilation system: system libraries are used extensively, and the autoconf/automake tools are used to configure the compilation system.

Although Cinelerra-CV may technically be called a fork, the relationship between Heroine Virtual and Cinelerra-CV is rather friendly. Heroine Virtual at times contributes to discussions on the mailing lists, and incorporates many of the changes made in the repository.

Heroine Virtual posted the following message on their website describing the relationship:

Up until Cinelerra 2.1 the versioning of Cinelerra-CV followed that of Heroine Virtual. After Heroine Virtual released a new version, Cinelerra-CV merged relevant code from the new HV variant and into their variant. CV was appended to the end of the version number to indicate the community version (For example, after the 2.1 merger the CV version was labeled 2.1CV).

Starting with release 2.2, Cinelerra-CV uses its own versioning scheme, but still merges code from Cinelerra-HV. Following the 26th June 2019, the official web pages were taken offline and the URL redirects to the website for Cinelerra-GG.

The new official site of Cinelerra-CV was published on July 1 2020. The source code of Cinelerra-CV is available from the new official repo on GitHub . The new official Cinelerra-CV Mailing List is available here. The Cinelerra-CV Mailing list from 2001 is archived. The complete collection of old (previous) Cinelerra-CV Mailing List archives is referenced/linked from this page of the new official Cinelerra-CV site.

Cinelerra-CVE is a Cinelerra-CV fork created for experimenting with Cinelerra's code. The fork was created by the main Cinelerra-CV developer (2012-2018) Einar Rünkaru in June 2008 and published in the middle of March 2010.

The repository of Cinelerra-CVE is available on GitHub  and shows frequent updates. To know more about Cinelerra-CVE, visit this page on the new official
Cinelerra-CV site.

Lumiera

In the beginning of April 2008, the Cinelerra community announced a complete rewrite of the current community version, named as Lumiera. It was born as a rewrite of the Cinelerra codebase called Cinelerra3 but soon was separated into an independent project with its own name. There is no usable application as of March 2019. The project remains in a pre-alpha status of development with a yearly development news update Lumiera news. It has build instructions, and there is a binary Debian/Ubuntu build of the development preview available.

Lumiera's native interface is written in GTK+, although other interfaces will be possible.

Cinelerra-GG Infinity

Cinelerra-GG, a separate variant of Cinelerra by William Morrow and Phyllis Smith, started with merged code from Cinelerra-HV and Cinelerra-CV but quickly grew. It was first developed within Cinelerra.org (Cinelerra 4.6-mod, Cinelerra 5.0), then within the site of Cinelerra-cv.org (Cinelerra 5.0, Cinelerra 5.1, Cinelerra GG 5.1), and since December 2018 with its own website cinelerra-gg.org as Cinelerra-GG Infinity. William died on 11/2020 during a bicycle ride, but Phyllis continues to work on Cinelerra-GG. A new developer is now making frequent updates.

An important issue is that Cinelerra-GG reduces reliance on system libraries by including them where practical, like ffmpeg and OpenEXR. This makes it more predictable on different platforms, and also allows it to pick up new versions before the platform does.

Cinelerra-GG is determined to get as close as possible to what can be expected from professional level video editing software (NLE) for the Linux platform.

Its software features include support for recent versions of ffmpeg, extensive color correction tools, Ultra HD up to 8K, more than 400 video- and audio effects, two interfaces for audio plug-ins (LADSPA, and LV2 such as Calf Studio Gear), multiple denoisers and motion stabilizers, multi-camera editing, proxies, smart folders media filtering, 8, 10 and 12 bit color spaces, advanced trim, live preview of resources, shared tracks, group edits, horizontal and/or vertical timeline split, rendering pre-configuration options, and the ability to save workspace layouts. It supports over 400 video/picture formats for decoding, and over 140 for encoding, including Apple ProRes, AV1, and WEBP. It has a ¨Sketcher" plug-in for free-hand drawing, supports creating HD Blu-ray, and DVDs, and some OpenCV plugins like FindObj. It allows nested clips, and clip sharing between projects ("file-by-reference").

Its hardware support is for jog-wheels ShuttlePRO V.2 and ShuttleXpress from Contour Design, multiple monitors, HiDPI, and hardware-supported decoding/encoding via VAAPI/VDPAU/CUDA.

Like the other Cinelerra variants (except Lumiera) Cinelerra-GG uses its own GUI. It has eleven GUI themes to cater to user preferences.

The GG variant is under active development, with regular stable releases. It is supplied as an 64 or 32 bit AppImage for Linux. The source code is available as (manual) monthly download or from its git.

Before 2021, it was supplied as a multi user program pre-packaged for eight different Linux distributions (Ubuntu, Debian, Arch, OpenSuse, Slackware, Fedora, Centos, Mint), and FreeBSD. When the applicable repository was added to a distribution's update manager, the monthly updates would appear automatically. In addition, there were single-user builds for the eight Linux distributions plus Gentoo, as tar files. All those builds are available in 64-bit, for Debian 9, Slackware and Ubuntu 14 there are also 32-bit single user builds. As a proof-of-concept, with the 2020-01 release was a Windows version with limited functionality; for details see the manual's chapter 1.

In addition to the GG variant's monthly releases, it is also available in two Linux variants dedicated to multimedia: AVLinux, and Bodhi Linux Media. It is also included in DeLinuxCo, and in lightweight Elive, of which the 32 bit version is usable on older computers.

Cinelerra-GG communicates with it users and developers through three platforms: its forum (user oriented), a bug tracker (feature requests, bugs, roadmap), and a mailing list (developers discussions). Each monthly release has a significant number of changes resulting from discussions and exchanges of information on these platforms.

Cinelerra-GG has an extensive, actively maintained manual in both PDF and HTML form, which is also accessible from within the Cinelerra-GG program. The manual is helpful for both beginners (e.g. Quickstart section) and professionals. There is also a YouTube channel with tutorials.

History of Cinelerra versions
Events from the original creator Heroine Virtual have been indicated with HV, those of the "community version" with CV, and those of the GG Infinity variant with GG.

See also

List of video editing software
Comparison of video editing software

References

Further reading

External links
 Differences between Cinelerra versions
 Cinelerra.org website managed by Michael Collins
 Cinelerra-HV website
 Cinelerra-HV source (2021) and bug tracker
 Cinelerra-HV manual "Secrets of Cinelerra" (2009)
 Cinelerra-CV website
 Cinelerra-CV source
 Cinelerra-CV manual
 Cinelerra-CV mailing list 
 Cinelerra-GG website
 Cinelerra-GG source (2022)
 Cinelerra-GG manual (2022)

Free video software
Linux-only free software
Video software
Linux audio video-related software
Video editing software
Video editing software that uses GTK
Software that uses FFmpeg